Valerdina Manhonga (born 26 December 1980) is a Mozambican female professional basketball player.

External links
Profile at afrobasket.com

1980 births
Living people
Mozambican women's basketball players
Shooting guards

Natural de : Lichinga-Niassa
Casada: Gilberto Nhantumbo 
Filhos: Mirza Noemia Nhantumbo e Alissah Daniela Nhantumbo 
Profissão: Aduaneira 
Pais: Daniel Diogo Manhonga e Margarida Marcolino Bicula 
Irmãos: Danilo Daniel Manhonga, Guilton Daniel Manhonga, Aduilia Daniel Manhonga, Ana Daniel Manhonga, Noel Manhonga, Gueterres Budane e Carla Budane

Participação em Campeonatos
Mundial de Basquetebol Turquia 2014
Afrobaskt:
Nigeria 2005, 
Senegal 2007, 
Benin 2009, 
Mali 2011,
Moçambique 2013

Jogos Africanos:
Argelia 2006
Maputo 2011
Jogos da Lusofonia
Portugal 2009 
India-Goa 2014

Jogos da Commwelth 
Melbourne 2006

Medalhas
Selecção Nacional de Moçambique 
Ouro - Jogos da Lisofonia, Goa 2014
Prata - Afrobaskt 2013, Maputo
Bronze - Afrobaskt 2005, Abuja
Medalhas
Clubes
Ouro- Desportivo Afrobaskt Maputo 2007
Ouro - Desportivo Afrobaskt Nairobi
2008
Ouro - Liga Muçulmana Afrobaskt 2012 costa de Marfim

Prata
2010 - Desportivo Afrobaskt Bezerte
2009 - Desportivo Afrobaskt Coutonou 

Campeonato Nacional de Basquetebol 
Ouro 
2008/9/10 Desportivo
2011/2 Liga Muçulmana 
Prata 
2003 Académica 
2014 Costa do Sol 

Campeonato da Cidade de Maputo 
Prata
2003 Académica 
2014 Costa do Sol